The 2021 Texas A&M–Corpus Christi Islanders baseball team represented Texas A&M University–Corpus Christi during the 2021 NCAA Division I baseball season. The Islanders played their home games at Chapman Field and were led by fourteenth–year head coach Scott Malone. They were members of the Southland Conference.

Preseason

Southland Conference Coaches Poll
The Southland Conference Coaches Poll was released on February 11, 2021 and the Islanders were picked to finish sixth in the conference with 146 votes.

Roster

Schedule and results

Posteason

Conference Accolades 
Player of the Year: Colton Cowser – SHSU
Hitter of the Year: Colton Eager – ACU
Pitcher of the Year: Will Dion – MCNS
Relief Pitcher of the Year: Tyler Cleveland – UCA
Freshman of the Year: Brennan Stuprich – SELA
Newcomer of the Year: Grayson Tatrow – ACU
Clay Gould Coach of the Year: Rick McCarty – ACU

All Conference First Team
Chase Kemp (LAMR)
Nate Fisbeck (MCNS)
Itchy Burts (TAMUCC)
Bash Randle (ACU)
Mitchell Dickson (ACU)
Lee Thomas (UIW)
Colton Cowser (SHSU)
Colton Eager (ACU)
Clayton Rasbeary (MCNS)
Will Dion (MCNS)
Brennan Stuprich (SELA)
Will Warren (SELA)
Tyler Cleveland (UCA)
Anthony Quirion (LAMR)

All Conference Second Team
Preston Faulkner (SELA)
Daunte Stuart (NSU)
Kasten Furr (UNO)
Evan Keller (SELA)
Skylar Black (SFA)
Tre Obregon III (MCNS)
Jack Rogers (SHSU)
Pearce Howard (UNO)
Grayson Tatrow (ACU)
Chris Turpin (UNO)
John Gaddis (TAMUCC)
Trevin Michael (LAMR)
Caleb Seroski (UNO)
Jacob Burke (SELA)

All Conference Third Team
Luke Marbach (TAMUCC)
Salo Iza (UNO)
Austin Cain (NICH)
Darren Willis (UNO)
Ryan Snell (LAMR)
Tommy Cruz (ACU)
Tyler Finke (SELA)
Payton Harden (MCNS)
Mike Williams (TAMUCC)
Cal Carver (NSU)
Levi David (NSU)
Dominic Robinson (SHSU)
Jack Dallas (LAMR)
Brett Hammit (ACU)

All Conference Defensive Team
Luke Marbach (TAMUCC)
Nate Fisebeck (MCNS)
Anthony Quirion (LAMR)
Darren Willis (UNO)
Gaby Cruz (SELA)
Julian Gonzales (MCNS)
Colton Cowser (SHSU)
Avery George (LAMR)
Will Dion (MCNS)

References:

References

Texas AandM-Corpus Christi
Texas A&M–Corpus Christi Islanders baseball seasons
Texas AandM-Corpus Christi Islanders baseball